The Nadreau Lake is a freshwater body located in the unorganized territory of Lac-Jacques-Cartier, in the La Côte-de-Beaupré Regional County Municipality, in the administrative region of Capitale-Nationale, in the province of Quebec, in Canada.

The hydrographic side of this lake is mainly served by a few forest roads for the needs of forestry and recreational tourism activities.

Because of its altitude, the surface of Lake Nadreau is generally frozen from the end of November to the beginning of April; however, safe circulation on the ice is generally done from mid-December to the end of March. The water level is controlled by a dam built at its mouth.

Geography 
Lake Nadreau is the head water body of the Jacques-Cartier River. This lake receives the waters on the west side of two small lakes: Plamondon lake and an unnamed lake. The latter empties westwards into "Petit Pré lake" ( long;).

Toponymy 
The surname "Nadreau" is of French origin.

The toponym "Lac Nadreau" was formalized on December 5, 1968 at the Place Names Bank of the Commission de toponymie du Québec.

See also 

 Jacques-Cartier River
 Lac-Jacques-Cartier, an unorganized territory
 La Côte-de-Beaupré Regional County Municipality
 Capitale-Nationale, administrative region

Notes and references 

Lakes of Capitale-Nationale
La Côte-de-Beaupré Regional County Municipality
Laurentides Wildlife Reserve